Abbacchio (pronounced ah-bahk-yo) is an Italian preparation of lamb. Abbacchio is consumed throughout central Italy.

History 
Throughout central Italy, including Sardinia, pastoralism was the main source of meat. The tradition of consuming Abbacchio spread in ancient times where mainly adult sheep were slaughtered. The slaughter of lamb was forbidden except during the Easter period and until June.

Classification 
According to the classification of Sardinian Lamb IGP, Abbacchio is a suckling lamb that is a little over a month old and up to 7 kilograms in weight.

Recipes

Abbacchio alla cacciatora 
Pieces browned in lard and then cooked for about 45 minutes with garlic, sage and rosemary doused with salted anchovy paste crushed and cooked in the meat sauce.

Abbacchio alla romana 
Browned whole in garlic, oil and chopped ham. Cooking is completed with rosemary, vinegar, salt and pepper. It is usually served with roasted potatoes.

Costolette di abbacchio a scottadito 
Ribs greased with lard, salted and peppered, and cooked over coals.

See also
 Roman cuisine
 Italian cuisine

References

External links 
 
 

Lamb dishes
Barbecue
Meat
Roman cuisine
Italian cuisine